Leech–Parker Farmhouse is a historic home located at Lima in Livingston County, New York. It was built about 1800 and is a -story, five-bay settlement period dwelling designed in a New England building tradition. The L-shaped structure is built on a rubblestone foundation and consists of the original structure with a 1-story gable-roofed addition. Also on the property are a privy and well dating from the 19th century.

It was listed on the National Register of Historic Places in 1989.

References

Houses on the National Register of Historic Places in New York (state)
Federal architecture in New York (state)
Houses completed in 1800
Houses in Livingston County, New York
National Register of Historic Places in Livingston County, New York